{{Infobox musical artist
| honorific_prefix = 
| name             = Abass Akande
| honorific_suffix = 
| image            = Obesere.jpg
| caption          = 
| native_name      = 
| native_name_lang = 
| birth_name       = Abass Akande
| alias            = Omo Rapala, Papa Tosibe, Sidophobia, Oba Alasakasa, Omo Idan| birth_date       = January 20 
| birth_place      = Ibadan, Oyo State, Nigeria
| origin           = 
| death_date       = 
| death_place      = 
| genre            = 
| occupation       = Singer-songwriter
| instrument       = Vocals
| years_active     = 1981–present
| label            = 
| associated_acts  = 
| website          = 
| module           = 
| module2          = 
| module3          = 
}}Abass Akande Obesere (born January 20, 1965) also known by his stage name  Omo Rapala''', is a Nigerian artist, Singer and record producer who is a native of Ibadan, the largest city in Western Nigeria. A popular Fuji musician, Obesere forced his way into the limelight through his unusual music style and slangs usage that throws his fans into a frenzy. Following the paths of other successful musicians such as Sikiru Ayinde Barrister, Obesere also has taken his own brand of Fuji music all over the world. He was initially signed with Sony Music but moved onto other labels after payment disputes. For most of his musical career, he had a long-time rivalry with K1 De Ultimate who is also a popular Fuji musician.

He is currently signed with Mayors Ville Entertainment an artist management firm, a subsidiary of Maxgolan Entertainment Group, a record company located in Lagos, Nigeria.

Alhaji Obesere survived a ghastly car accident at Ijebu-Ode in his Lexus jeep LX470 on his way to Lagos. The accident occurred on Sunday April 8, 2012 at around 7:30pm. Report said that the artist and 2 other passengers only sustained minor injuries and were immediately transferred to Orisunbare Hospital, Jakande Isolo, Lagos.

Discography

Albums
"Introduction"
"Oodua"
"Diplomacy"
Elegance
"Live in Europe"
"Asakasa"  (Sony) 
"O.B.T.K" (Sony)
"Mr. Teacher" (Sony)
"Omorapala Overthrow" (Dudu Heritage)
"American Faaji Series 1&2" (Dudu Heritage)
Mr Teacher
"His Excellency" (Bayowa)
"Egungun Be Careful (Bayowa)
"Old Skool Lape" (Bayowa)
"Apple Juice" (Bayowa)
"Okokoriko" (Bayowa)
"Obaadan" (Bayowa)
"Effissy" (Corporate Pictures)
"Confirmation" (Corporate Pictures)
New Face
Jaforie
Alaimore (Ingrate)
Mr Magic

Singles
Egungun Be Careful
Baby Mi sexy
Murderer
EKO
Paraga (ft Fayrous)
Ebelesua (ft Olamide)
Mobinu tan
Emi ni
Basira
Slow Slow (Remix)
Ja Fo rie (ft Reminisce)
Ibi ni ma kusi (ft Mz Kizz)
Ki nan so (ft 9ice)
Obesere tilo
Alhaji (ft Seriki)
Ki nan so (ft 9ice) (Remix)
Baby mi (Ft 2star)
Wind E
E ma le won
GBO se yen so
Asakasa
O.B.T.K
Mr Teacher
Ileke Idi
Omo iku
Mr Teacher part II
Baba Baba Tide
Amin ase
Ibaje

See also 
 List of Nigerian musicians

References

External links
Website with pictures of performances by Fuji Musicians including Abass Akande Obesere

Yoruba musicians
Nigerian male musicians
Living people
Musicians from Ibadan
Yoruba-language singers
1965 births